Tel Aviv Sourasky Medical Center (commonly referred to as Ichilov Hospital) is largest teaching hospital and large general hospital as serving Tel Aviv, Israel and its metropolitan area and the second-largest hospital complex in the country. The complex is spread out over an area of 150,000 m2 and incorporates four hospitals: Ichilov General Hospital and Ida Sourasky Rehabilitation Center, Lis Maternity Hospital, and Dana Children's Hospital. The director of the Tel Aviv Sourasky Medical Center is Prof. Ronni Gamzu.

History

The hospital was originally named after the Ichilov family. Ichilov Hospital was founded in 1963 as a one-building facility designed by architect Arieh Sharon. Renamed Tel Aviv Sourasky Medical Center, it now encompasses three hospitals over an area of 150,000 square meters: Ichilov General Hospital and Ida Sourasky Rehabilitation Center, Lis Maternity Hospital, and Dana Children's Hospital. The center also serves as an instructional and research center affiliated with Tel Aviv University's Sackler Medical School and Sheinborn Nursing School.

The main building of Ichilov Hospital was built with the donations of Ted Arison and Shari Arison.

In 2011, a 700–1,000 bed bombproof emergency facility was opened. The building, with 13 stories above ground and four stories underground, provides protection against conventional, chemical and biological attack. Construction began in 2008. The cost of the building was $110 million, with a donation of $45 million from Israeli billionaire Sammy Ofer. The architect was Arad Sharon, grandson of Arieh Sharon who designed the original facility.

In 2022, the world's largest emergency room was opened at Ichilov Hospital. The 8,000 square meter facility is equipped with facilities for self-triage and robots to guide people around.

See also
Health care in Israel
Medical tourism in Israel

References

External links

Tel Aviv Medical Center

Hospital buildings completed in 1963
Hospitals in Israel
Hospitals established in 1963
Buildings and structures in Tel Aviv
1963 establishments in Israel